The Ten Medieval Commentators (Tamil: உரையாசிரியர்கள் பதின்மர்) were a canonical group of Tamil scholars whose commentaries on the ancient Indian didactic work of the Kural are esteemed by later scholars as worthy of critical analysis. These scholars lived in the Medieval era between the 10th and 13th centuries CE. Among these medieval commentaries, the commentaries of Manakkudavar, Kaalingar, and Parimelalhagar are considered pioneer by modern scholars.

Commentaries

The Kural remains the most reviewed work of the Tamil literature, with almost every scholar down the ages having written commentaries on it. Of the several hundred commentaries written on the didactic work over the centuries, the commentaries written by a group of ten medieval scholars are considered to have high literary value. The ten scholars are:
 Manakkudavar (c. 10th century CE)
 Dhamatthar (c. 11th century CE)
 Nacchar (c. 11th century CE)
 Paridhi (c. 11th century CE)
 Pariperumal, also known as Kaliperumal (c. 11th century CE)
 Thirumalaiyar (c. 11 to 13th century CE)
 Mallar (c. 11 to 13th century CE)
 Kaalingar (c. late 12th century CE)
 Dharumar (c. 13th century CE)
 Parimelalhagar (c. 13th century CE)

Of these, only the commentaries of Manakkudavar, Paridhi, Pariperumal, Kaalingar, and Parimelalhagar are extant in their complete (or almost complete) form. The commentaries of Dharumar, Dhamatthar, and Nacchar have survived only in fragmentary form, and those of Thirumalaiyar and Mallar are now lost completely. The oldest of these is the commentary of Manakkudavar (c. 10th century CE), which is considered to be the closest to the original text of the Kural, and is considered the cornerstone against which other medieval commentaries are compared in order to find variations in them. Each commentators followed his own sense of logic in the arrangement of the chapters and the couplets within them. Researchers have found as many as 16, 20, 120, and 171 variations in the ordering of the Kural couplets by Pari Perumal, Paridhi, Parimelalhagar, and Kaalingar, respectively, with respect to the commentary by Manakkudavar. According to M. Shanmugham Pillai, there are about 305 textual variations in all the commentaries combined. The last of these medieval commentaries is that of Parimelalhagar, who wrote the commentary around 1271–1272 CE, as indicated in an inscription at the Varadharaja Perumal Temple at Kanchipuram. Parimelalhagar's commentary is followed ever since as the standard for numbering of the Kural chapters and the couplets within each chapter.

Chapter order variations
Valluvar wrote the Kural literature in three parts, namely, Book I, Book II, and Book III, containing a total of 133 chapters in all, without splitting the books further into any subdivisions. They also changed the ordering of the couplets within each chapter widely. These variations are not standard either but vary according to different commentators. While the variations in the ordering of the couplets according to various commentators are found across the work, variations in the grouping and ordering of chapters are found chiefly in the Book on Virtue (Book I).

The following table lists the variations between ordering of chapters in Book I by Manakkudavar (the oldest) and that by Parimelalhagar (the latest).

The chapters "Shunning meat-eating," "Not stealing," "Not lying," "Refraining from anger," "Ahimsa," and "Non-killing", all of which originally appear under subsection "Domestic virtues" in Manakkudavar's version, appear under "Ascetic virtues" in Parimelalhagar's version. Similarly, the chapters "Kindness of speech," "Self-control," "Not envying," "Not coveting another’s goods," "Not backbiting," and "Not uttering useless words", which appear under "Ascetic virtue" in Manakkudavar's version, appear under "Domestic virtue" in Parimelalhagar's version. Given these subdivisions of domestic and ascetic virtues are later additions, both the domestic and ascetic virtues in the Book of Aṟam are addressed to the householder or commoner. Ascetic virtues in the Kural, according to A. Gopalakrishnan, does not mean renunciation of household life or pursuing of the conventional ascetic life, but only refers to giving up avarice and immoderate desires and maintaining self-control that is expected of every individual.

Legacy
All these commentators lived in a time that is now known among literary scholars as "the golden age of Tamil prosaic literature". This era is also dubbed "the age of literary commentaries".

An old Tamil poem describes all these ten commentators thus:

See also

 Tirukkural
 Commentaries in Tamil literary tradition
 Bhashya

Citations

References

 
 
 
 
 
 
 
 
 
 
 
 
 
 
 
 
 
 
 
 
 
 

 
Tirukkural
Medieval Tamil Nadu
Medieval India
Ten medieval commentators
Indian culture-related lists
Indian literature-related lists
History of Tamil Nadu